Jiannong Cao is a computer scientist researching distributed computing, parallel computing, pervasive computing, mobile computing, and wireless networking. He is an IEEE fellow, the chair professor at Department of Computing, Faculty of Engineering at Hong Kong Polytechnic University. He was the head of Department of Computing at Hong Kong Polytechnic University. He is also the director of PolyU Internet and Mobile Computing Lab.

Cao is the author of many books about computer science, including "Parallel and Distributed Processing and Applications" and "Wireless Sensor Networks for Structural Health Monitoring".

References

Hong Kong scientists
Fellow Members of the IEEE
Living people
Year of birth missing (living people)
Academic staff of Hong Kong Polytechnic University